Parapoynx ophiaula is a moth in the family Crambidae. It was described by Edward Meyrick in 1936. It is found in the south-eastern part of the Democratic Republic of the Congo and north-western Zambia.

The wingspan is 15–16 mm. The forewings are dark fuscous, the base whitish dorsally with a blackish discal spot. The hindwings are white with a blackish subterminal line. Adults have been recorded on wing from January to March in May, July and December.

References

Acentropinae
Moths described in 1936